Patuakhali-3 is a constituency represented in the Jatiya Sangsad (National Parliament) of Bangladesh since 2019 by SM Shahjada of the Awami League.

Boundaries 
The constituency encompasses Dashmina and Galachipa upazilas.

History 
The constituency was created for the first general elections in newly independent Bangladesh, held in 1973.

Ahead of the 2014 general election, the Election Commission reduced the boundaries of the constituency. Previously it had included one union parishad of Patuakhali Sadar Upazila: Auliapur.

Members of Parliament

Elections

Elections in the 2010s

Elections in the 2000s

Elections in the 1990s

References

External links
 

Parliamentary constituencies in Bangladesh
Patuakhali District